Carmen Virginia Tyson-Thomas (born January 10, 1991) is an American basketball player. She won both the Slovenian and Chilean championship in 2014 and led the Icelandic Úrvalsdeild kvenna in scoring in 2017 and 2018. In 2018, she won the FIBA Africa Clubs Champions Cup with Ferroviario Maputo.

College
Tyson-Thomas played for Syracuse from 2009 to 2013, averaging 8.9 points in 136 games.

Syracuse statistics

Source

Professional career
Tyson-Thomas became a Slovenian champion on April 16, 2014, with ZKK Athlete Celje after beating ZKK Triglav Kranj in the finals. In July 2014, Tyson-Thomas helped Los Leones Quilpe win the Chilean championship after scoring 38 points in the title clinching game.

She joined Keflavík of the Icelandic Úrvalsdeild kvenna prior the 2014–2015 season. She helped Keflavík to the Basketball Cup final. She played the game despite a broken rib, but was unable to prevent a loss to Grindavík. Keflavík also made it to the Úrvalsdeild finals but lost 0–3 to Snæfell.

In December 2015, Tyson-Thomas signed with Njarðvík of the Icelandic Division I. In nine games, she averaged league leading 36.1 points and 17.8 rebounds. Despite her play, Njarðvík missed the playoffs. However, in June, 2016, the club was offered a vacant spot in the Úrvalsdeild kvenna due to Hamar's withdrawal from the league.

Thomas started the season with stellar play and was named the best player of the first half of the season by the Icelandic Basketball Federation. Despite leading the league in scoring with 36.7 points per game, Njarðvík cut its ties with Tyson-Thomas in March, siding communication difficulties with her. Furthermore, Njarðvík's head coach, Agnar Gunnarsson, criticized her for belittling her teammates and claimed she thought she was bigger than the club. In turn, Tyson-Thomas denied the allegation and criticized the head coach for his words, saying that her teammates fought against her firing.

In July 2017, Tyson-Thomas signed with Skallagrímur.

After Skallagrímur was knocked out of the 2018 Úrvalsdeild playoffs, Tyson-Thomas signed with the Eastern Mavericks of the Australian Premier League. She went on to lead the league in scoring and rebounds with 25.3 points and 14.3 rebounds per game and was named to the Premier League All Star Five.

In November 2018, Tyson-Thomas signed with Ferroviario Maputo in Mozambique. On November 25, she won the FIBA Africa Clubs Champions Cup with the club, scoring 20 points in Ferroviario's 59–56 victory against Inter Clube in the finals. She made the go-ahead three point shot with 42 seconds remaining, giving Ferroviario a 58–56 lead.

She returned to the Eastern Mavericks for the 2019 season where she averaged league leading 27.6 points in 21 games. She was again named to the Premier League All Star Five while also being awarded the Halls Medal.

In 2020 she signed with the Norwood Flames of the Premier League, which had been rebranded as NBL1 Central. Before the start of the 2020 season, it was canceled due to the coronavirus pandemic in Australia.

Awards and accomplishments

Club honours
Slovenian champion: 2014
Chilean champion: 2014

Individual awards
Slovenian All-Star: 2014
Slovenian All-Star MVP: 2014
Úrvalsdeild scoring champion: 2017, 2018
Icelandic D1 scoring champion: 2016
Icelandic D1 rebounding champion: 2016

References

External links
Slovenian statistics at kzs.si
Icelandic statistics at kki.is
Profile at Eurobasket.com
College statistics at yahoo.com
Australian Premier League Statistics at sportstg.com
African Champions Cup profile at fiba.basketball

1991 births
Living people
American expatriate basketball people in Finland
American expatriate basketball people in Iceland
American women's basketball players
Úrvalsdeild kvenna basketball players
Keflavík women's basketball players
Njarðvík women's basketball players
Skallagrímur women's basketball players
Shooting guards
21st-century American women